Artyom Sergeyevich Galadzhan (born 22 May 1998) is a Russian football player who plays as a forward for Ural-2 Yekaterinburg.

Club career
He made his debut in the Russian Premier League for FC Lokomotiv Moscow on 26 November 2016 in a game against FC Ural Yekaterinburg.

On 28 August 2018, he joined FC Orenburg on loan for the 2018–19 season. On 26 July 2019, the loan was renewed for the 2019–20 season.

On 24 January 2020, he moved on loan to FC Rotor Volgograd.

On 3 September 2020, he signed a 2-year contract with Nizhny Novgorod.

International
He represented Russia national under-17 football team at the 2015 UEFA European Under-17 Championship.

Honours

Club
Lokomotiv Moscow
 Russian Premier League: 2017–18

Career statistics

Club

References

External links
 
 

1998 births
People from Novorossiysk
Sportspeople from Krasnodar Krai
Living people
Russian footballers
Russia youth international footballers
Association football forwards
FC Lokomotiv Moscow players
FC Orenburg players
FC Rotor Volgograd players
FC Nizhny Novgorod (2015) players
FC Tom Tomsk players
FC Ural Yekaterinburg players
Russian Premier League players
Russian First League players
Russian Second League players